Eupatorium yakushimaense is a plant species in the family Asteraceae.

References

yakushimaense
Plants described in 1933